or  is a lake that lies on the border between Norway and Sweden. Almost all of the lake is located in Hamarøy Municipality in Nordland county, Norway with a very small part of the lake in Jokkmokk Municipality in Norrbotten County, Sweden.

See also
List of lakes in Norway

References

Hamarøy
Lakes of Nordland
Norway–Sweden border
International lakes of Europe
Lakes of Norrbotten County